SCO-spondin is a protein that in humans is encoded by the SSPO gene. SCO-spondin is secreted by the subcommissural organ, and contributes to commissural axon growth and the formation of Reissner's fiber, a fibrous aggregation of secreted molecules extending from the subcommissural organ to the end of the spinal cord.

References

Further reading 

 
 
 
 
 
 
 

Extracellular matrix proteins